Renmin East Road station is a subway station in Changsha, Hunan, China, operated by the Changsha subway operator Changsha Metro. It serves Lines 2 and 6.

Station layout
The station has one island platform.

History
The station opened on 29 April 2014. It later became an interchange on June 28, 2022 after the opening of Line 6.

References

Railway stations in Hunan
Railway stations in China opened in 2014